Welch's Regiment of Militia also known as the 10th New Hampshire Militia Regiment was called up at Candia, New Hampshire on September 27, 1777 as reinforcements for the Continental Army during the Saratoga Campaign of the American War of Independence. The regiment marched quickly to join the gathering forces of Gen. Horatio Gates as he faced British Gen. John Burgoyne in northern New York. The regiment served in Gen. William Whipple's brigade of New Hampshire militia. With the surrender of Burgoyne's Army on October 17 the regiment was disbanded on November 8, 1777.

References

External links
Bibliography of the Continental Army in New Hampshire compiled by the United States Army Center of Military History

Military units and formations established in 1777
Military units and formations disestablished in 1777
Welch's Regiment of Militia
1777 establishments in New Hampshire